The 2013 Louisiana Tech Bulldogs football team represented Louisiana Tech University in the 2013 NCAA Division I FBS football season. The Bulldogs were led by first-year head coach Skip Holtz as a member of Conference USA (C-USA) in the West Division. The Dawgs played their home games at Joe Aillet Stadium in Ruston, Louisiana. This was the Bulldogs inaugural season as members of C-USA.

Before the season

Recruiting

T–Day spring game

Sources:

The T–Day spring game was held at Joe Aillet Stadium on April 13, 2013.

Schedule

Game summaries

at NC State

Sources:

Lamar

Sources:

Tulane

Sources:

at Kansas

Sources:

vs. Army

Sources:

at UTEP

Sources:

North Texas

Sources:

at FIU

Sources:

Southern Miss

Sources:

at Rice

Sources:

Tulsa

Sources:

at UTSA

Sources:

After the season

NFL Draft

In May's 2014 NFL Draft, Justin Ellis was selected by the Oakland Raiders in the fourth round, and IK Enemkpali was selected by the New York Jets in the sixth round.

Roster

References

Louisiana Tech
Louisiana Tech Bulldogs football seasons
Louisiana Tech Bulldogs football